Andesiana similis is a moth of the Andesianidae family. It is known from Argentina (Neuquén Province).

The length of the forewings is 17.4–18.2 mm for males and about 21 mm for females. Adults fly from late October to mid-December in Nothofagus dombeyi forests with an understory of Chusquea culeou. They occur at altitudes between 640 and 950 meters.

External links
 Andesianidae, a new family of monotrysian moths (LepidopteraiAndesianoidea) from austral South America

Andesianidae
Andesianidae of South America
Fauna of the Andes
Moths of South America